Ghalghaï is the self-name of the Ingush people. It is most often associated with the term "ghala" (гIала) - tower/fortress and accordingly is translated as the people/inhabitants of towers/fortresses. Some scholars associate it with the ancient Gargareans and Gelaï mentioned in the 1st century in the work of the ancient historian and geographer Strabo. In Georgian sources, in the form of Gligvi, it is mentioned as an ethnonym that existed during the reign of Mirian I, as well as the ruler of Kakheti Kvirike III. In Russian sources, "Ghalghaï" first becomes known in the second half of the 16th century, in the form of "Kolkans"/"Kalkans", "Kolki"/"Kalki", "Kalkan people".

References

Bibliography 
 
 
 
 
 
 
 
 
 
 
 
 
 
 
 
 
 
 

Ethnonyms
Nakh peoples
Ethnonyms of the Ingush